The Nile minnow (Leptocypris niloticus) is a species of cyprinid fish found the Nile, Omo, Niger, Bénoué, Volta, and Senegal Rivers, and the Lake Chad basin. It was described by Léon-Daniel de Joannis in 1835.

References

Leptocypris
Danios
Fish of Africa
Fish described in 1835
Taxa named by Léon-Daniel de Joannis